"Grand Old Team" or "It's a Grand Old Team" may refer to one of two football songs:

 The Celtic Song, associated with Celtic Football Club
 The Everton Song, associated with Everton Football Club

Or, popular fan forum - GrandOldTeam.com